Davide Pirola (born 29 May 2001) is an Italian professional footballer who plays as a centre back for  club Lucchese.

Club career
Formed on Giana Erminio youth system, Pirola was promoted to the first team on 2019–20 season. He made his senior and Serie C debut on 25 August 2019 against Renate.

References

External links
 
 

2001 births
Living people
Italian footballers
Association football defenders
Serie C players
A.S. Giana Erminio players
Lucchese 1905 players